The Critics' Choice Movie Award for Best Original Screenplay is presented by the Critics Choice Association at the annual Critics' Choice Movie Awards.

The categories for screenplays have gone through several changes since their inception in 1995:

 From 1995 to 1996, the category Best Screenplay was presented, with no official nominees being announced but instead only a winner.
 From 1997 to 2000, the category was split into two, divided into Best Original Screenplay and Best Screenplay Adaptation.
 In 2001, the categories were merged into Best Screenplay again. From 2002 to 2008, the category was renamed to Best Writer.

In 2009, the distinction between original and adapted was implemented again, with two categories presented ever since, Best Original Screenplay and Best Adapted Screenplay.

Winners and nominees

1990s
Best Screenplay

Best Original Screenplay

2000s
Best Original Screenplay

Best Screenplay

Best Writer

Best Original Screenplay

2010s

2020s

See also
 Golden Globe Award for Best Screenplay
 BAFTA Award for Best Original Screenplay
 Academy Award for Best Original Screenplay
 Independent Spirit Award for Best Screenplay
 AACTA International Award for Best Screenplay
 Writers Guild of America Award for Best Original Screenplay

References

External links
 

S
Screenwriting awards for film